Jonathan Samuel Miles (born 21 February 1986) is an English cricketer. Miles is a right-handed batsman who bowls left-arm medium pace. He was born at Sutton Coldfield, Warwickshire.

Miles made his debut for Lincolnshire in the 2005 Minor Counties Championship against Cambridgeshire. He played Minor counties cricket for Lincolnshire from 2005 to 2007, making 14 Minor Counties Championship and six MCCA Knockout Trophy appearances. He joined the MCC Young Cricketers programme in 2008, and in that same season he made his List A debut for the Marylebone Cricket Club against Bangladesh A at The Racecourse, Durham. In Bangladesh A's innings, he took the wickets of Tamim Iqbal and Nazimuddin, finishing with figures of 2/44 from nine overs.

The 2010 season saw Miles play for Norfolk, with him making four appearances for the county in that seasons Minor Counties Championship. In that same season he also signed for the Unicorns team which would take part in the 2010 Clydesdale Bank 40, a team formed of players without current full-time contracts with one of the regular first-class counties. He made his List A debut for the team against Sussex. Miles has made twelve further List A appearances for the team, the last of which came against Gloucestershire in the 2011 Clydesdale Bank 40. In his thirteen appearances for the Unicorns, he has taken a total of 10 wickets at an average of 53.10, with best figures of 3/49.
In 2014 Jonathan signed For Billingborough Horbling and Threekingham CC for their first season in the  ECB Lincs Prem League. In 2023 Jonathan was named 1st XI captain for Hagley Cricket Club in Worcestershire Division 1.

References

External links
Jonathan Miles at ESPNcricinfo
Jonathan Miles at CricketArchive

1986 births
Living people
Cricketers from Sutton Coldfield
English cricketers
Lincolnshire cricketers
Marylebone Cricket Club cricketers
Norfolk cricketers
Unicorns cricketers
Shropshire cricketers